Escuela Integral de San Pablo Tacachico  are a Salvadoran professional football club based in San Pablo Tacachico, La Libertad, El Salvador.

The club currently plays in the Segunda División de Fútbol Salvadoreño.

History
On the 2014 the club participe in the third division

On 5 July 2015 the club had purchased a license to be able to compete in the newly increased second division.

San Pablo Municipal won the club first segunda division title, winning the Clausura 2019 title, after they defeated Platense 4–1 in penalties after tying in a two-legged series 3-3.

This was title was followed with the most devasting event in the club history, as San Pablo were unable to defeat El Vencedor (who were the 2018 Apertura Champion) in a promotion playoff 6–5 after penalties, after tying 0–0. Which prevented the club to play in the primera division (the top division in El Salvador) for the first time ever in the club history.

Honours

Domestic honours
 Segunda División Salvadorean and predecessors 
 Champions (1) : Clausura 2019
 Tercera División Salvadorean and predecessors 
 Champions:(1) :

Personnel

Current technical staff

Current squad
As of October 2021:

Squad changes for the Apertura 2018
In:
  TBD – Transferred from Free Agent
  TBD – Transferred from Free Agent

Out:
  TBA – Transferred to TBA

List of coaches
  Angel Orellana (May 2015 – June 2015)
  Efrain Burgos (June 2015 – Sep 2015)
  Pablo Quiñonez (Sep 2015 – Dec 2015)
  Miguel Angel Soriano  (Dec 2015 – Feb 2016)
  Juan Francisco Najarro (Mar 2016– Aug 2016)
  Bairon Ernesto Garcia (Sep 2016–)
  Juan Ramon Paredes (2016)
  Pablo Quiñones	(- June 2018)	
  Juan Ramon Sanchez (June 2018 – July 2019)
  Oscar 'Lagarto' Ulloa (July 2019 - December 2019)
  Henry Vanegas (December 2019 - August 2020)
  Wilber Aguilar (September 2020 - January 2021)
  Rafael Mariona (January 2021 - Present)

References

External links
 http://www.ceroacero.es/equipa.php?id=67508

Football clubs in El Salvador
Association football clubs established in 2015
2015 establishments in El Salvador